Alice Costandina Titus (born May 23, 1950) is an American political scientist and politician who has been the United States representative for  since 2013. Titus is a member of the Democratic Party. She served in the Nevada Senate and was its minority leader from 1993 to 2009. Before her election to Congress, Titus was a professor of political science at the University of Nevada, Las Vegas (UNLV), where she taught American and Nevada government for 30 years. She was the Democratic nominee for governor of Nevada in 2006.

Early life and education
Titus was born in Thomasville, Georgia. Her mother is of Greek descent, and she was raised Greek Orthodox. She grew up in Tifton, Georgia. Her first exposure to politics came at an early age, when her father Joe ran for the Tifton City Council. Her uncle, Theo Titus, served in the Georgia House of Representatives for many years. She attended a summer program at The College of William & Mary and was admitted full-time for the fall without a high school diploma. There she earned her bachelor's degree in political science. Titus went on to earn a master's degree from the University of Georgia and a Ph.D. from Florida State University.

Academic career
After a year teaching at North Texas State University, Titus moved to Nevada for a faculty position in the political science department at the University of Nevada, Las Vegas (UNLV).

Nevada Senate

First elected in 1988, Titus served for 20 years in the Nevada Senate, representing the 7th district.

In December 2010, Senate Majority Leader Harry Reid appointed her to a six-year term on the United States Commission on Civil Rights.

Regulation of credit card rates
Titus authored a bill banning "universal default clauses" that have enabled some credit card issuers to boost interest rates by 30% or more. The bill passed the Senate and Assembly, but was vetoed by Gibbons. Credit card providers Citibank and Chase rolled back or eliminated universal default clauses due to political pressure in the U.S. Congress.

Measure to care for pets in emergencies
Titus authored a bill that provides for the rescue of pets in a natural disaster emergency. It was co-sponsored by Senators Randolph Townsend and Valerie Wiener. Titus told Las Vegas television station KVBC: "We all remember heartbreaking scenes and stories from Louisiana, Mississippi and Florida.. When lives are turned upside down by disaster, people seek comfort and normalcy. To exacerbate problems by forcing a disaster victim to leave behind a beloved pet—a member of their family—is both unconscionable and entirely unnecessary. Emergency responders can and should take into account pets and service animals in disaster rescue and recovery plans. Planning could save disaster victims from needless additional pain at a most difficult time." The bill was signed into law in June 2007.

U.S. House of Representatives

Elections

2008

Democrats were heavily targeting 3rd district Republican incumbent Jon Porter. Their top candidate was Clark County prosecutor Robert Daskas, but Daskas dropped out in April for family reasons. Democrats then recruited Titus, who had won the district in her unsuccessful 2006 run for governor. Titus defeated Porter in November, 47% to 42%, becoming the first Democrat to represent the district. She was a major beneficiary of the overall anti-Bush sentiment in the Las Vegas area. She was elected Regional Whip in the 111th Congress.

2010

Republican former State Senator Joe Heck defeated Titus by less than 2,000 votes.

2012

The incumbent, Democrat Shelley Berkley, gave up the seat to run for the United States Senate. While the 3rd is considered a swing district, the 1st is far and away Nevada's safest Democratic seat. Titus initially faced a challenge from State Senator Ruben Kihuen in the primary. Kihuen dropped out in February 2012, reportedly due to trailing in polls and fundraising. This all but assured Titus's return to Congress after a two-year absence. She easily defeated her Republican challenger, Chris Edwards.

2014

Titus was reelected, defeating Republican nominee Annette Teijeiro with 56.9% of the vote. After this election, she became the only Democratic member of Nevada's U.S. House delegation, as fellow Democrat Steven Horsford was defeated.

2016

Titus defeated Republican nominee Mary D. Perry with 61.9% of the vote to Perry's 28.8%; independent Reuben D'Silva received 7.4%. This election saw Democrats pick up two U.S. House seats in Nevada.

2018

Titus defeated Republican nominee Joyce Bentley with 66.2% of the vote, her highest percentage to date.

2020

Titus won a rematch with Bentley, this time with 61.8% of the vote to Bentley's 33.4%.

2022

Titus was redistricted into a much more competitive district. She faced progressive Amy Vilela in the Democratic primary, winning with 79.8% of the vote; in the general election, Titus defeated Republican nominee Mark Robertson, 51.6% to 46.0%. Most poll aggregators rated the race a tossup.

Tenure

On December 18, 2019, Titus voted for both articles of impeachment against President Donald Trump.

As of June 2022, Titus had voted in line with Joe Biden's stated position 100% of the time.

Committee assignments

 Committee on Transportation and Infrastructure (2009–2011; 2013–present)
 Subcommittee on Aviation
 Subcommittee on Highways and Transit
 Subcommittee on Water Resources and Environment
 Subcommittee on Economic Development, Public Buildings and Emergency Management (chair) 
 Committee on Foreign Affairs (2017–present)
 Subcommittee on Asia and the Pacific
 Subcommittee on Terrorism, Nonproliferation, and Trade

Past
 Committee on Education and Labor (2009–2011)
 Committee on Homeland Security (2009–2011)
 Committee on Veterans' Affairs (2013–2017)
 Subcommittee on Disability Assistance and Memorial Affairs (Ranking Member)
 Subcommittee on Economic Opportunity

Caucus memberships
 Congressional Arts Caucus
 United States Congressional International Conservation Caucus
 U.S.-Japan Caucus
 Congressional Hellenic Caucus
 Medicare for All Caucus
 Blue Collar Caucus
 Americans Abroad Caucus (co-chair)

Political positions

Nuclear issues

Titus is the author of Bombs in the Backyard: Atomic Testing and American Politics and Battle Born: Federal-State Relations in Nevada During the Twentieth Century.

Abortion
In 2014 Titus received a 100% rating from Planned Parenthood for opposing a nationwide abortion ban after 20 weeks and supporting abortion access in the District of Columbia and through the Patient Protection and Affordable Care Act.

Armenia–Azerbaijan war
In September 2020, Titus started a successful petition to rename a Library of Congress heading from "Armenian massacres" to "Armenian genocide" in the wake of Armenian genocide recognition by the United States Congress in 2019.

On October 1, 2020, Titus co-signed a letter to Secretary of State Mike Pompeo that condemned Azerbaijan’s offensive operations against the Armenian-populated enclave of Nagorno-Karabakh, denounced Turkey’s role in the Nagorno-Karabakh conflict, and called for an immediate ceasefire.

Redistricting
On December 16, 2021, Titus expressed her frustration with the process of redrawing Nevada's congressional districts to make them more electorally competitive. According to the Nevada Current, she told an AFL-CIO town hall, "I totally got fucked by the legislature on my district." She added, "I'm sorry to say it like that, but I don't know any other way to say it." Democrats who control the state legislature in Nevada gerrymandered districts to make two swing districts stronger for Democrats. She warned that three safe seats are now in danger and at risk of turning Republican in the 2022 election.

Voting rights
On February 9, 2023, Titus voted against H.J.Res. 24: Disapproving the action of the District of Columbia Council in approving the Local Resident Voting Rights Amendment Act of 2022 which condemns the District of Columbia’s plan that would allow noncitizens to vote in local elections.

Syria
In 2023, Titus voted against H.Con.Res. 21 which directed President Joe Biden to remove U.S. troops from Syria within 180 days.

Political campaigns

2006

Incumbent Governor Kenny Guinn could not run in 2006 due to term limits. Titus won the Democratic nomination, but lost to Republican Congressman Jim Gibbons. Titus won Clark County, but her margin there was not enough to overcome Gibbons's landslide margin in the 2nd district.

Personal life
Titus has been married to Thomas C. Wright since 1979. Wright is a retired professor of history at UNLV. His studies in Latin American history have taken the couple on extended journeys throughout Central and South America and to Spain.

She is Greek Orthodox.

See also
 Women in the United States House of Representatives

References

External links

 Congresswoman Dina Titus official U.S. House website
 Dina Titus for Congress
 

 

|-

|-

|-

1950 births
21st-century American politicians
21st-century American women politicians
American people of Greek descent
American women political scientists
American political scientists
College of William & Mary alumni
Democratic Party members of the United States House of Representatives from Nevada
Eastern Orthodox Christians from the United States
Female members of the United States House of Representatives
Florida State University alumni
Living people
Democratic Party Nevada state senators
Politicians from Carson City, Nevada
Politicians from Las Vegas
People from Thomasville, Georgia
People from Tifton, Georgia
United States Commission on Civil Rights members
University of Georgia alumni
University of Nevada, Las Vegas faculty
University of North Texas faculty
Women state legislators in Nevada
Greek Orthodox Christians from the United States
Eastern Orthodox Christians from Nevada